Xenochodaeus simplex is a species of sand-loving scarab beetle in the family Ochodaeidae. It is found in North America.

References

Further reading

 
 
 

Scarabaeiformia
Beetles described in 1854